is a former Japanese football player.

Playing career
Matsuda was born in Chiba on September 4, 1980. After graduating from high school, he joined newly was promoted to J2 League club, FC Tokyo in 1999. However he could not play at all in the match. In August 1999, he moved to Japan Football League (JFL) club Yokohama FC on loan. He played many matches as forward and the club won the champions. In 2000, he returned to FC Tokyo. Although the club was promoted to J1 League from 2000, he could hardly play in the match. In September 2001, he moved to J2 club Ventforet Kofu on loan and played many matches. In 2002, he returned to FC Tokyo. However he could hardly play in the match. In 2003, he moved to J2 club Montedio Yamagata. Although he scored many goals, he got hurt in May and he could not play at all in the match until end of 2003 season. In 2004, he could hardly play in the match too. In 2005, he moved to J2 club Kyoto Purple Sanga. Although he could not play many matches, he scored 8 goals in 2005 and the club was promoted to J1 from 2006. In 2007, he moved to JFL club TDK (later Blaublitz Akita). He played as regular player and scored 18 goals. In 2008, he moved to JFL club Tochigi SC. He played many matches and the club was promoted to J2 from 2009. In September 2009, he moved to TDK again. He played as regular player and scored many goals every season. He also became a top scorer with 20 goals in 2011. He retired end of 2013 season.

Club statistics

References

External links

Profile at Akita
Profile at Yamagata

1980 births
Living people
Association football people from Chiba Prefecture
Japanese footballers
J1 League players
J2 League players
Japan Football League players
FC Tokyo players
Yokohama FC players
Ventforet Kofu players
Montedio Yamagata players
Kyoto Sanga FC players
Blaublitz Akita players
Tochigi SC players
Association football forwards